This is a list of newspapers in Brazil, both national and regional. Newspapers in other languages and themes newspapers are also included.

In 2012, Brazil's newspaper circulation increased by 1.8 percent, compared to the previous year. The average daily circulation of newspapers in Brazil is 4.52 million copies.

National

Regional

Acre

Amapá

Amazonas

Bahia

Ceará

Distrito Federal

Espírito Santo

Goiás

Maranhão

Mato Grosso

Mato Grosso do Sul

Minas Gerais

Pará

Paraná

Paraíba

Pernambuco

Piauí

Rio de Janeiro

Rio Grande do Norte

Rio Grande do Sul

Rondônia

Roraima

Santa Catarina

São Paulo

Sergipe

Tocantins

Finance newspapers

Sports newspapers

Religion-themed

Other languages

Defunct
  (São Paulo)
 A Notícia (Rio de Janeiro)
 Correio da Manhã
 
  (Cachoeiro de Itapemirim)
 
 
  (São Paulo)
  (São Paulo)
 Folha da Manhã (São Paulo)
  (São Paulo)
  (Rio de Janeiro)
  (São Paulo)
 Jornal da Tarde (São Paulo)
 Jornal do Commercio (Rio de Janeiro)
 Notícias Populares (São Paulo)
 O Jornal
 
 O Pasquim
  (Fortaleza)
 
 Última Hora
 ValeParaibano

See also
 List of magazines in Brazil
 Television in Brazil
 
 
 Radio in Brazil

References

Further reading

External links
 
 
 

Brazil
List
Newspapers